The 2015–16 season was Skënderbeu Korçë's sixth season competing in the Kategoria Superiore, having won five consecutive titles in the last five years. It covered a period from 1 July 2015 to 30 June 2016.

The 2015–16 season was one of the greatest campaigns in the history of Skënderbeu Korçë. The club retained the championship for the fifth consecutive season and become the first Albanian club to reach group stage of an UEFA club competition.

Season overview

By eliminating Milsami Orhei in the third qualifying round of 2015–16 UEFA Champions League, Skenderbeu become first Albanian club to reach Champions League play-off.

Players

Italics players who left the team during the season.
Bold players who came in the team during the season.

Transfers

In

Out

Pre-season and friendlies

Competitions

Albanian Supercup

Kategoria Superiore

League table

Results summary

Results by round

Matches

Albanian Cup

First round

Second round

Quarter-finals

Semi-finals

UEFA Champions League

Second qualifying round

Third qualifying round

Play-off round

UEFA Europa League

Group stage

References

External links

KF Skënderbeu Korçë seasons
Skënderbeu Korçë
Skënderbeu Korçë
Albanian football championship-winning seasons